Dawid Tkacz (born 25 January 2005) is a Polish professional footballer who plays as a midfielder for Górnik Łęczna.

Career statistics

Club

Notes

References

External links

2005 births
Living people
Polish footballers
Poland youth international footballers
Association football midfielders
Górnik Łęczna players
Ekstraklasa players
I liga players